Kaveinga abbreviata is a species of ground beetle in the subfamily Rhysodinae. It was described by Lea in 1904.

References

Kaveinga
Beetles described in 1904